Northridge High School is located in rural northwestern Licking County, Ohio, and serves several townships in that part of the county, as well as a part of southern Knox County, Ohio.  It has a USPS address of Johnstown, Ohio, although it is about five miles northeast of that town.

The original High School is now Alexandria Elementary. After moving from the current elementary, the High School was moved to what is now the current middle school building. Today, both the middle school and high school are in the same building, but fairly separated. As of beginning of the school year 2008, 4th and 5th grade students are attending school in the Intermediate on the campus of the High School.

The mascot is the Northridge Viking.

Sports 
Northridge High School is a member of the Licking County League (LCL)

Sydney Koker, 2021 Division II OHSAA State High Jump Champion

External links
 District Website

Notes and references

High schools in Licking County, Ohio
Public high schools in Ohio